The Oklahoma District Attorneys Council (DAC) is an agency of the state of Oklahoma that provides professional organization for the education, training and coordination of technical efforts of all Oklahoma state prosecutors and to maintain and improve prosecutor efficiency and effectiveness in enforcing the laws of the state.

The Council is composed of five members, one of which is the Attorney General of Oklahoma and the remaining four are sitting District Attorneys. The Council is responsible for appointing an Executive Coordinator to act as chief executive officer of the Council. The current Executive Coordinator is Kathryn Boyle Brewer.

The Council was established in 1976 during the term of Governor of Oklahoma David L. Boren.

History
The District Attorneys Council was created by the Oklahoma Legislature in 1976

Functions
The primary function of the District Attorneys Council is to provide a professional organization for the education, training and coordination of technical efforts of all District Attorneys of the State. The DAC assists local DAs by providing financial, personnel, and other administrative services upon request. The Council is the administrative agency for the Crime Victims Compensation Board and the state administrative agency for several federal grants.

It is important to note that the DAC does not have control over individual District Attorneys. Its functions are advisory and administrative support only. The DAC does not have the power to investigate, stop, or otherwise prevent a District Attorney from prosecuting an individual or group.

Leadership
The District Attorneys Council is under the supervision of the Secretary of Safety and Security. Under current Governor of Oklahoma Kevin Stitt, Major General Thomas H. Mancino is serving as the Secretary.

Council members
The Council is composed of five members. The members are the Attorney General of Oklahoma, the President of the Oklahoma District Attorneys Association, the President-elect of the Oklahoma District Attorneys Association, one District Attorney selected by the Oklahoma Court of Criminal Appeals for a three year term, and one District Attorney selected by the Board of Governors of the Oklahoma Bar Association for a three year term. A member of the Council must vacate their position on the Council upon termination of the member’s official position as Attorney General or District Attorney.

As of 2022, the members of the Council are:
Matt Ballard, District Attorney Claremore, Oklahoma - Chair
Chris Boring, District Attorney Woodward, Oklahoma - Vice Chair
Greg Mashburn, District Attorney Norman, Oklahoma - Member
Steve Kunzweiler, District Attorney Tulsa, Oklahoma - Member
Jimmy Harmon, Chief of the Criminal Division, Attorney General's Office, State of Oklahoma - Member

Divisions
District Attorneys Council
Executive Coordinator
Assistant Coordinator
Executive Division -  serves as direct staff of the Executive Coordinator and to the Council
Information Technology Division - provides information to improve information technology services through efficient and effective execution of technological research, acquisition, and testing to local District Attorneys, liaison to the Oklahoma State Bureau of Investigation
Finance Division - provides budgeting, purchasing, and payroll service to the Council
Federal Grants and Programs Division - serves as state administering agency for all federal grants and programs applied for by the Council
Victims Services Division - serves as state administering agency for Oklahoma's Crime Victims Compensation Fund as well as staff to the Crime Victims Compensation Board
Training and Outreach Division - this division is responsible for training the District Attorneys, and their staff
Uninsured Vehicle Enforcement Diversion (UVED) Program - this division manages the state-wide initiative aimed at reducing the number of uninsured vehicles on Oklahoma roadways.

Notes

See also
District Attorney

References

External links
District Attorneys Council official website

State law enforcement agencies of Oklahoma
1976 establishments in Oklahoma